Lucchesi Park is a public park located in Petaluma, California. It is maintained by the City of Petaluma and features activities for families. These activities include a playground, lake, tennis, walking/biking paths, and a dog run area. The park is also a bird watching spot, due to the lake and woods nearby. One can often see Mallards, Ring-billed gulls, Brewer's blackbird, the bushtit, and the Golden-crowned sparrow, just to name a few.

References 

Parks in Sonoma County, California
Petaluma, California